George Scott Lewis Jr. (born March 12, 2000) is an American professional basketball player who last played for the Charlotte Hornets of the National Basketball Association (NBA), on a two-way contract with the Greensboro Swarm of the NBA G League. He played college basketball for the Florida Gators.

High school career
Lewis played high school basketball for the Ranney School in Tinton Falls, New Jersey. He was unanimously ranked as a 5-star recruit from all major recruiting services for the class of 2019. On January 20, 2019, Lewis committed to the University of Florida. He is originally from The Bronx, New York and resides in Hazlet, New Jersey.

Recruiting
On October 2, 2018, Lewis announced that he will be playing college basketball at the University of Florida, choosing the Gators over Kentucky.

College career
In his first game in a Florida uniform, Lewis had nine points, five rebounds and two assists as the Gators defeated North Florida 74–59. On February 26, 2020, Lewis scored 18 points in a 81–66 win against LSU. He had a career-high 19 points on March 7, in a 71–70 loss to Kentucky. At the conclusion of the regular season, Lewis was named to the SEC All-Freshman Team. Lewis averaged 8.5 points and 3.6 rebounds per game, leading the team in blocks (36) and finishing second to Keyontae Johnson in steals with 36. On April 6, 2020, it was announced that Lewis would return to Florida for the 2020–21 season. He missed three games as a sophomore after contracting COVID-19. Lewis averaged 7.9 points, 3.1 rebounds and 1.6 steals per game. Following the season, he declared for the 2021 NBA draft and hired an agent.

Professional career

Charlotte Hornets (2021–2022)
Lewis was selected in the second round of the 2021 NBA draft with the 56th pick by the Charlotte Hornets. On August 3, 2021, the Hornets signed him to a two-way contract for the 2021–22 season. Under the terms of the deal, he split time between the Hornets and their NBA G League affiliate, the Greensboro Swarm. On June 29, 2022, the Hornets declined to sign Lewis to a qualifying offer, making him an unrestricted free agent.

Lewis joined the Hornets for the 2022 NBA Summer League. On July 7, 2022, he broke his left leg during a practice session. He underwent surgery to address the injury the next day and was ruled out indefinitely.

Career statistics

NBA

|-
| style="text-align:left;"| 
| style="text-align:left;"| Charlotte
| 2 || 0 || 3.5 || — || — || .500 || .0 || .5 || .5 || .0 || .5
|- class="sortbottom"
| style="text-align:center;" colspan="2"| Career
| 2 || 0 || 3.5 || — || — || .500 || .0 || .5 || .5 || .0 || .5

College

|-
| style="text-align:left;"| 2019–20
| style="text-align:left;"| Florida
| 30 || 22 || 29.1 || .441 || .361 || .817 || 3.6 || .8 || 1.2 || 1.2 || 8.5
|-
| style="text-align:left;"| 2020–21
| style="text-align:left;"| Florida
| 21 || 9 || 25.6 || .445 || .318 || .673 || 3.1 || 1.5 || 1.6 || 1.0 || 7.9
|- class="sortbottom"
| style="text-align:center;" colspan="2"| Career
| 51 || 31 || 27.6 || .443 || .343 || .759 || 3.4 || 1.1 || 1.4 || 1.1 || 8.2

References

External links
Florida Gators bio
USA Basketball bio

2000 births
Living people
21st-century African-American sportspeople
African-American basketball players
American men's basketball players
Basketball players from New Jersey
Charlotte Hornets draft picks
Charlotte Hornets players
Florida Gators men's basketball players
Greensboro Swarm players
McDonald's High School All-Americans
People from Hazlet, New Jersey
Ranney School alumni
Shooting guards
Sportspeople from Monmouth County, New Jersey